Germanonautilus is a cephalopod genus included in the nautilid family Tainoceratidae, found widespread in the Triassic of North America, Europe, Asia, and north Africa. The shell is a moderately involute nautilicone (a form based on Nautilus); whorl section subquadrate to trapezoidal, widest across the umbilical shoulders, flanks flattened and ventrally convergent, venter flat and wide, dorsum narrowly and deeply impressed. The suture is with broad and deep lateral lobes and a shallow ventral lobe. The siphuncle  is central and nummuloidal, composed of expanded segments that give a beaded appearance.

References

Bernhard Kummerl, 1964.  Nautiloidea-Nautilida.  Treatise on Invertebrate Paleontology Part K. Geological Society of America and University of Kansas Press. 
 Germanonautilus in Paleobiology Database 
J.J. Sepkoski, 2002. List of Nautiloid genera. 

Triassic cephalopods of North America
Nautiloids
Prehistoric nautiloid genera